The 2019 USL Championship season is the ninth season of the USL Championship and third under Division II sanctioning. This is the first season in which the league is operating under the name "USL Championship," having used the name "United Soccer League" through 2018. The season began on March 8, 2019, and concluded on October 20, 2019; with each team playing 34 matches. 36 teams competed in the 2019 USL Championship season, split into 2 conferences of 18 teams each. Louisville City FC are the two-time defending USL Cup champions.

The 2019 season is the last for the current version of Nashville SC. The club's identity transferred to a Major League Soccer team that started to play in 2020. Additionally, this season was the last for Ottawa Fury FC. On November 8, the club announced that it had suspended operations; Fury FC had received sanctioning from its country's governing body, Canada Soccer, but was denied by U.S. Soccer and the continental governing body of CONCACAF.

Changes from 2018
Expansion clubs
 Austin Bold FC
 Birmingham Legion FC
 El Paso Locomotive FC
 Hartford Athletic
 Loudoun United FC
 Memphis 901 FC
 New Mexico United

Departing clubs
 FC Cincinnati (moved to MLS)
 Penn FC (on hiatus; plans to join USL League One in 2020)
 Richmond Kickers (moved to USL League One)
 Toronto FC II (moved to USL League One)

Rebranded clubs
 Seattle Sounders FC 2 rebranded as Tacoma Defiance and moved to Tacoma, Washington

Teams

The following teams are playing in the 2019 USL Championship season:

Competition format
The season began the weekend of March 8–10 and will conclude the weekend of October 18–20. The 2019 USL Cup Playoffs are expected to begin October 25–27, and conclude with the final match November 14–18.

This is the first season where the USL teams will only play teams within their own conference for regular-season and playoff games until the USL Cup final. Thus, each team will play a balanced home-and-away schedule against each of the other teams in its conference, resulting in a 34-game schedule.

Managerial changes

League table
Eastern Conference 

Western Conference

Results table

Playoffs

Format
The top 10 teams from each conference will qualify for the playoffs. Each conference will have a "play-in round" where the 7 seed will host the 10 seed and the 8 host 9. The lowest remaining seed will then play the 1 seed and the other play-in survivor will play the 2 seed to form an 8 team playoff bracket. Each of the 8 team playoff brackets will consist of teams within their respective conference and the matches will be hosted by the higher seed. The USL Cup will be the season's only match that involves teams from different conferences; it will be hosted by the conference champion with the better regular-season record.

Bracket

Eastern Conference

Western Conference

USL Championship Final 

Championship Game MVP: Konrad Plewa (SLC)

Attendance

Average home attendances
Ranked from highest to lowest average attendance.

Updated to games of October 20, 2019.
Sources: USL Championship Soccer Stadium Digest

Statistical leaders

Top scorers 

Source:

Top assists 

Source:

Shutouts

Source:

Hat-tricks

League awards

Individual awards

All-League Teams

Monthly awards

Weekly awards

References

External links
USL official website

	

 
USL Championship seasons
2019 in American soccer leagues